A wedding is a formal ceremony which unites people in marriage.

Wedding may also refer to:

Film and TV
Wedding (TV series), a Korean drama broadcast by KBS in 2005
"Wedding", an episode of the British sitcom Men Behaving Badly
A Wedding (1978 film), an American comedy directed by Robert Altman
A Wedding (2016 film), a drama directed by Stephan Streker also known as Noces
"A Wedding" (Glee), an episode of the U.S. television series Glee

Other
Wedding (Berlin), a locality
Wedding (album), by Shinhwa
"Wedding" (song), by Hep Stars
"Wedding", a song by Angels of Light from Everything Is Good Here/Please Come Home

A Wedding (opera), a 2004 comic opera based on Robert Altman's 1978 film A Wedding

See also

  or 
The Wedding (disambiguation)
Destination Wedding, a 2018 film starring Winona Ryder and Keanu Reeves